Safeguard is a New Zealand magazine devoted to occupational health and safety. It features articles and information on managing health and safety in the workplace and is aimed at employers in all industries and at health and safety professionals. The magazine was launched as a quarterly in 1988 by the Occupational Safety and Health Service (OSH) of the Department of Labour. It was subsequently taken over by a commercial company, Colour Workshop. Safeguard is now published bi-monthly by Thomson Reuters (Auckland).

See also 
EHS Today
Hazards (magazine)
Safety+Health Magazine – National Safety Council

References

External links 
 

Magazines published in New Zealand
Professional and trade magazines
Magazines established in 1988
Bi-monthly magazines
English-language magazines
Occupational safety and health
Quarterly magazines
Health magazines
Mass media in Auckland